Emmanuel Kent Forbes Jr. (born January 13, 2001) is an American football cornerback for the Mississippi State Bulldogs. He was named to the 2022 College Football All-America Team.

High school career
Forbes attended Grenada High School in Grenada, Mississippi. As a senior, he had 49 tackles and eight interceptions and added 31 receptions for 499 yards and seven touchdowns. He committed to Mississippi State University to play college football.

College career
As a true freshman at Mississippi State in 2020, Forbes played in all 11 games and made nine starts. He finished the year with 45 tackles and five interceptions, with three of those interceptions being returned for a touchdown. As a sophomore in 2021, he started all 13 games, recording 59 tackles and three interceptions. Forbes remained a starter his junior year in 2022.

References

External links

Mississippi State Bulldogs bio

2001 births
Living people
All-American college football players
American football cornerbacks
Mississippi State Bulldogs football players
Players of American football from Mississippi